Twisp Municipal Airport  is a municipal-owned public-use airport located one nautical mile (1.85 km) southeast of the central business district of Twisp, a town in Okanogan County, Washington, United States.

Facilities and aircraft 
It has one runway designated 10/28 with an asphalt surface measuring 2,701 by 36 feet (823 x 11 m).

For the 12-month period ending December 30, 2012, the airport had 7,700 aircraft operations, an average of 21 per day: 97.4% general aviation, 1.3% air taxi, and 1.3% military. At that time there were 33 aircraft based at this airport: 91% single-engine, 3% multi-engine, 3% helicopter and 3% ultralight.

References

External links 
 Twisp Municipal (2S0) page at Washington State DOT
 Aerial photo from USGS The National Map

Airports in Washington (state)
Transportation buildings and structures in Okanogan County, Washington